This is a list of awards and nominations received by Nicholas Britell, an American film and television composer.

It includes a Primetime Emmy Award as well as nominations for three Academy Awards, a BAFTA Award and a Golden Globe Award.

Major Associations

Academy Awards
The Academy Awards are a set of awards given annually for excellence of cinematic achievements. The awards, organized by the Academy of Motion Picture Arts and Sciences, were first held in 1929 at the Hollywood Roosevelt Hotel. Britell has received three nominations.

{| class="wikitable
|-
! scope="col" style="width:1em;"| Year
! scope="col" style="width:35em;"| Nominated work
! scope="col" style="width:40em;"| Category
! scope="col" style="width:5em;"| Result
! scope="col" style="width:1em;"| Ref
|-
| 2017
| Moonlight
| rowspan="3"| Best Original Score
| 
| rowspan="3"| 
|-
| 2019
| If Beale Street Could Talk
| 
|-
| 2021
| Don't Look Up
| 
|-
|-style="border-top:2px solid gray;"

BAFTA Film Awards
The BAFTA Award is an annual award show presented by the British Academy of Film and Television Arts. The awards were founded in 1947 as The British Film Academy, by David Lean, Alexander Korda, Carol Reed, Charles Laughton, Roger Manvell and others. Britell has been nominated once.

{| class="wikitable
|-
! scope="col" style="width:1em;"| Year
! scope="col" style="width:35em;"| Nominated work
! scope="col" style="width:40em;"| Category
! scope="col" style="width:5em;"| Result
! scope="col" style="width:1em;"| Ref
|-
| 2019
| If Beale Street Could Talk
| rowspan="3"| Best Original Score
| 
|
|-
| 2021
| Don't Look Up
| 
|
|-

Golden Globe Awards
The Golden Globe Award is an accolade bestowed by the 93 members of the Hollywood Foreign Press Association (HFPA) recognizing excellence in film and television, both domestic and foreign. Britell has been nominated once.

{| class="wikitable
|-
! scope="col" style="width:1em;"| Year
! scope="col" style="width:35em;"| Nominated work
! scope="col" style="width:40em;"| Category
! scope="col" style="width:5em;"| Result
! scope="col" style="width:1em;"| Ref
|-
| 2017
| Moonlight
| Best Original Score
| 
|

Primetime Emmy Awards
{| class="wikitable
|-
! scope="col" style="width:1em;"| Year
! scope="col" style="width:35em;"| Nominated work
! scope="col" style="width:40em;"| Category
! scope="col" style="width:5em;"| Result
! scope="col" style="width:1em;"| Ref
|-
| 2019
| rowspan="2"| Succession
| Outstanding Original Main Title Theme Music
| 
|
|-
| 2020
| Outstanding Music Composition for a Series (Original Dramatic Score)
| 
| 
|-
| 2021
| The Underground Railroad
| Outstanding Music Composition For A Limited Or Anthology Series, Movie Or Special (Original Dramatic Score)
| 
|
|-
| 2022
| Succession
| Outstanding Music Composition for a Series (Original Dramatic Score)
| 
|

Other Award

Black Reel Awards

Critics' Choice Movie Awards
The Critics' Choice Movie Awards is an awards show presented annually by the American-Canadian Critics Choice Association (CCA) to honor the finest in cinematic achievement.

Hollywood Music in Media Awards
The Hollywood Music in Media Awards (HMMA) is an award organization honoring original music (Song and Score) in all forms visual media including film, TV, video games, trailers, commercial advertisements, documentaries, music videos and special programs.

Satellite Awards

World Soundtrack Awards

Critics Awards

References 

Britell, Nicholas